Betsy Baxter Snite (later Riley, December 20, 1938 – June 15, 1984) was an American alpine ski racer and Olympic medalist. She competed in the Winter Olympics in 1956 and 1960 and won the silver medal in the slalom in the latter.

Born in Grand Rapids, Michigan, Snite grew up in Norwich, Vermont, and was U.S. slalom champion in 1955 at age 16, edging Olympic gold medalist Andrea Mead Lawrence. She participated in the giant slalom in 1956 at Cortina d'Ampezzo, but did not finish.

Four years later at Squaw Valley, Snite won the silver medal in the slalom. In the giant slalom she finished fourth, but did not finish the downhill. Shortly before the Olympics, she was on the cover of Sports Illustrated.

According to the Vermont Ski Museum, Betsy learned to ski on Cemetery Hill in Norwich and with the Ford K. Sayre Memorial ski program. When she got too good, she trained with the Dartmouth College ski team.

She married Bill Riley in 1964, and they resided in Vermont at Stowe. She died at age 45 in 1984, after a brief battle with cancer.

Olympic results

References

External links

Sports Illustrated cover – February 1, 1960
 – Olympic results
U.S. Ski & Snowboard Hall of Fame – Betsy Snite
Vermont Ski Museum – Hall of Fame
Vermont Sports Hall of Fame Bio

1938 births
1984 deaths
American female alpine skiers
Alpine skiers at the 1956 Winter Olympics
Alpine skiers at the 1960 Winter Olympics
Olympic silver medalists for the United States in alpine skiing
Medalists at the 1960 Winter Olympics
Sportspeople from Vermont
20th-century American women
20th-century American people